Óscar Villarreal may refer to:

 Óscar Villarreal (baseball) (born 1981), Mexican baseball player
 Óscar Villarreal (footballer) (born 1981), Colombian footballer